William Street is a suburban distributor and one of two major cross-streets in the central business district of Perth, Western Australia. Commencing in western Mount Lawley, its route takes it through the Northbridge café and nightclub district as well as the CBD.

Route description

After  it reaches Vincent Street, and the southern edge of Mount Lawley.

William Street realigns itself one block further east through a  reverse curve. At this point, it intersects Brisbane Street, which bring southbound State Route 51 traffic to William Street. Prior to the restoration of two-way traffic on Beaufort Street, all southbound traffic was redirected via Brisbane Street to William Street. Beyond this intersection, the road is the southbound component of State Route 51.

The Horseshoe Bridge takes the road between the Perth railway station and Yagan Square. Beyond the bridge, the road continues in its south-south-westerly direction through the Perth CBD. It intersects all the major east–west routes. At the southern end of the bridge is Wellington Street. This is followed by Murray and Hay streets, which are pedestrian malls to the east; and then St Georges Terrace, which is a through-route for vehicular traffic. One more block takes it to an intersection with Mounts Bay Road, to the west, and the Esplanade to east. After one more block, alongside the Elizabeth Quay Bus Station and railway station, the road ends at Riverside Drive. This intersection also connects a Mitchell Freeway exit ramp and Kwinana Freeway southbound entrance ramp, components of the Narrows Interchange.

Public transport
William Street is serviced by buses running through Northbridge. Most of these services deviate via Elizabeth Quay Bus Station before continuing to their destination.

Buildings 
There is an entrance to 108 St Georges Terrace (formerly the Bankwest Tower) on William Street. Wesley Church is on the corner of William Street and Hay Street. At 427 William St is the Perth Mosque, the oldest mosque in Perth, which opened in 1906. Australia Place is further down William Street. There is a 24-hour McDonald's, as well as a KFC and Hungry Jack's. Both sides of William Street between Wellington Street and Hay Street have recently been redeveloped, Raine Square on the west and Gordon Stephenson House on the east side of the street.

Although their addresses are on adjacent streets, 108 St Georges Terrace, the Gledden Building, the Palace Hotel and Walsh's Building are all on the corners along William Street. Wentworth Hotel is on the corner with Murray Street

In 2009 the East Perth Redevelopment Authority was involved in redeveloping six properties on the eastern side of William Street, between Roe and Newcastle Streets.

St George's Anglican Grammar School is at 50 William Street.

History

The street formerly directly passed over the Fremantle and Joondalup railway lines at the Horseshoe Bridge. These lines were later sunk as part of the Perth City Link project but the bridge remains. A ramp which took William Street traffic from The Esplanade onto the southbound Kwinana Freeway was closed in 2004 during the construction of the Esplanade railway station.

Traffic direction
William Street began as a two-way street, and during the era of trams in Perth, there were tram lines along it. In the late 20th century and early 21st century, William Street was two-way north of Brisbane Street, and one-way southbound on the other side. In 2008, the section between The Esplanade and Wellington Street returned to two-way traffic. Further conversion occurred in 2010, when the Horseshoe Bridge was changed back to two-way traffic, and in 2013 the section between the bridge and Newcastle Street was converted. The final section, between Newcastle and Brisbane Streets, was converted to two-way in late 2019.

See also

Notes

External links

 OnWilliam – Association of William Street art and retail proprietors
 

 
Elizabeth Quay
Streets in Perth central business district, Western Australia